Serbia competed at the 2009 Mediterranean Games held in Pescara, Italy. 153 athletes in 17 sports represented Serbia. Serbia won total of 35 medals, 9 gold, 13 silver and 13 bronze medals.

Medals by sport

Medalists

External links
 Serbia at the 2009 Mediterranean Games - Olympic Committee of Serbia

Nations at the 2009 Mediterranean Games
2009
Mediterranean Games